Vídeň is a municipality and village in Žďár nad Sázavou District in the Vysočina Region of the Czech Republic. It has about 500 inhabitants.

History

The first written mention of Vídeň is from 1370.

References

Villages in Žďár nad Sázavou District